Gaston Henri Fayaud (7 September 1914 – 6 October 1989) was a French boxer. Born in Limoges, he competed in the 1932 Summer Olympics and in the 1936 Summer Olympics.

Career
In 1932, Fayaud lost in the first round to István Énekes in the flyweight competition. Four years later he was again eliminated in the first round of the flyweight class after losing his fight to Walter Siegfried.

Fayaud won the 1935 and 1936 Amateur Boxing Association British flyweight title.

References

External links
 

1914 births
1989 deaths
Sportspeople from Limoges
Flyweight boxers
Olympic boxers of France
Boxers at the 1932 Summer Olympics
Boxers at the 1936 Summer Olympics
French male boxers